Erkki Tamila (5 May 1911 – 25 February 2004) was a Finnish long-distance runner. He competed in the marathon at the 1936 Summer Olympics.

Tamila set two world records. He ran in Joensuu, Finland, on 30 August 1937 the 15 mile in 1h 19:48.6. In the same city he ran the 25 kilometer in 1h 21.7 on 6 September.

During World War II it was announced in January 1940 that he would have died.

References

1911 births
2004 deaths
Athletes (track and field) at the 1936 Summer Olympics
Finnish male long-distance runners
Finnish male marathon runners
Olympic athletes of Finland
Sportspeople from Turku